This is a list of all captains of the Western Bulldogs, an Australian rules football club in the Australian Football League (AFL) and AFL Women's.

VFL/AFL

AFL Women's

References

Western Bulldogs Honour Roll

Western Bulldogs
Captains
Melbourne sport-related lists